Luiz Suzin Marini (28 September 1935 – 31 January 2023) was a Brazilian politician. A member of the Brazilian Democratic Movement Party, he served in the Legislative Assembly of Santa Catarina from 1991 to 1999.

Suzin Marini died of colon cancer in Florianópolis, on 31 January 2023, at the age of 87.

References

1935 births
2023 deaths
20th-century Brazilian politicians
People from Santa Catarina (state)
Brazilian Democratic Movement politicians
Members of the Legislative Assembly of Santa Catarina
Deaths from colorectal cancer
Deaths from cancer in Santa Catarina (state)